Anadema is a genus of sea snails, marine gastropod mollusks in the family Colloniidae.

This name is evidently a junior homonym of Anadema Meuschen, 1787 (Echinodermata).

Species
Species within the genus Anadema include:
 Anadema macandrewii (Mörch 1868)

References

 McLean J.H. & Gofas S. (2008). Notes on the genus Anadema H. & A. Adams, 1854 (Gastropoda: Colloniidae). Iberus 26(1): 53-63.

External links
 Adams H. & Adams A. (1853-1858). The genera of Recent Mollusca; arranged according to their organization. London, van Voorst. Vol. 1: xl + 484 pp.; vol. 2: 661 pp.; vol. 3: 138 pls. [Published in parts: Vol. 1: i-xl (1858), 1-256 (1853), 257-484 (1854). Vol. 2: 1-92 (1854), 93-284 (1855), 285-412 (1856), 413-540 (1857), 541-661 (1858). Vol. 3: pl. 1-32 (1853), 33-96 (1855), 97-112 (1856), 113-128 (1857), 129-138 (1858) 

Colloniidae
Monotypic gastropod genera